Ekaterina Valeryevna Prokofyeva (born March 13, 1991) is a Russian water polo player. She competed at the 2016 Summer Olympics for the Russian national team in the Women's event winning the bronze medal.  She had previously competed at the 2008 and 2012 Summer Olympics.

She also competed at the 2013 Summer Universiade in Kazan where she won the gold medal.

Prokofyeva was named Best Female Player of the Year at the 2018 Total Player Awards.

Club honours
 2 LEN Euro League
 2017.
 2018.
 1 LEN Super Cup
 2017.
 '''10 Russian Federation Championships
 2010, 2011, 2012, 2013, 2014, 2015, 2016, 2017, 2018 and 2019.

See also
 List of Olympic medalists in water polo (women)
 List of players who have appeared in multiple women's Olympic water polo tournaments
 List of women's Olympic water polo tournament top goalscorers
 List of World Aquatics Championships medalists in water polo

References

External links
 
 Ekaterina Prokofyeva – athlete profile at Universiade 2013
 

Russian female water polo players
1991 births
Living people
Olympic water polo players of Russia
Water polo players at the 2008 Summer Olympics
Water polo players at the 2012 Summer Olympics
People from Volgodonsk
World Aquatics Championships medalists in water polo
Water polo players at the 2016 Summer Olympics
Olympic bronze medalists for Russia
Olympic medalists in water polo
Medalists at the 2016 Summer Olympics
Universiade medalists in water polo
Universiade gold medalists for Russia
Medalists at the 2013 Summer Universiade
Water polo players at the 2020 Summer Olympics
Sportspeople from Rostov Oblast
21st-century Russian women